Sky Aviation may refer to:
Sky Aviation (Indonesia), a regional airline based in Indonesia
Sky Aviation (Sierra Leone), an airline based in Sierra Leone
 Sky Aviation Leasing International, an aviation leasing company that was acquired by Goshawk Aviation